David Roscoe "Emp" Peacock (March 15, 1890 – January 28, 1944) was a college football player and coach, as well as a politician.

University of Georgia

Playing

1912
As a player, he was an All-Southern guard captain for the Georgia Bulldogs of the University of Georgia  in 1912. An Athens newspaper said he was "probably the most aggressive lineman in the South." He weighed 185 pounds.

Coaching
Peacock was an assistant for the 1914 Georgia Bulldogs, leaving to get his master's degree at the University of Michigan.

Politics
He was once president pro-tempore of the Georgia state Senate.

Personal life
Peacock died in St. Petersburg, Florida on January 28, 1944, at the age of 53.

References

1890 births
1944 deaths
American football guards
Georgia Bulldogs football coaches
Georgia Bulldogs football players
Mercer Bears football coaches
All-Southern college football players
People from Dodge County, Georgia
Players of American football from Georgia (U.S. state)